The Uruguay International Film Festival is an international film festival that takes place every year in the city of Montevideo, Uruguay.

Established 1982, it is organized by Cinemateca Uruguaya. In April 2022 it is celebrating its 40th edition.

See also 
 Cinema of Uruguay
 Cinemateca Uruguaya

References

External links 
 

1982 establishments in Uruguay
Film festivals in South America
Uruguayan film awards
Tourist attractions in Uruguay
Film festivals established in 1982
Festivals in Uruguay